Tram Sessions (November 11, 1898 – January 24, 1984) was an American football center for the Alabama Crimson Tide of the University of Alabama. Sessions was selected All-Southern thrice. Sessions was the first secretary-treasurer of the Alabama Sports Hall of Fame.

Sessions represented Jefferson County, Alabama in the Alabama State House of Representatives from the 1940s to the 1960s. He sponsored a house resolution which called for a renewal of the long-suspended Alabama–Auburn rivalry, but it was voted down by the Alabama State Senate by a 21-9 vote. Despite the setback, the football rivalry was renewed within the next five years.

References

American football centers
1898 births
1984 deaths
Alabama Crimson Tide football players
All-Southern college football players
Players of American football from Birmingham, Alabama
Members of the Alabama House of Representatives
20th-century American politicians